Alameda (Spanish for "tree-lined path") is a city in Alameda County, California, located in the East Bay region of the Bay Area. The city is primarily located on Alameda Island, but also spans Bay Farm Island and Coast Guard Island, as well as a few other smaller islands in San Francisco Bay. The city's estimated population in 2019 was 77,624.

History

Spanish & Mexican era

Alameda occupies what was originally a peninsula connected to Oakland. Much of it was low-lying and marshy. The higher ground nearby and adjacent parts of what is now downtown Oakland were the site of one of the largest coastal oak forests in the world. Spanish colonists called the area Encinal, meaning "forest of evergreen oak". Alameda is Spanish for "grove of poplar trees" or "tree-lined avenue." It was chosen as the name of the city in 1853 by popular vote.

The inhabitants at the time of the arrival of the Spanish in the late 18th century were a local band of the Ohlone tribe. The peninsula was included in the vast Rancho San Antonio granted in 1820 to Luis Peralta by the Spanish king who claimed California. The grant was later confirmed by the Republic of Mexico upon its independence in 1821 from Spain.

Over time, the place became known as Bolsa de Encinal or Encinal de San Antonio.

Post-Conquest era

The city was founded on June 6, 1853, after the United States acquired California following the Mexican–American War of 1848. The town originally contained three small settlements. "Alameda" referred to the village at Encinal and High streets, Hibbardsville was located at the North Shore ferry and shipping terminal, and Woodstock was on the west near the ferry piers of the South Pacific Coast Railroad and the Central Pacific. Eventually, the Central Pacific's ferry pier became the Alameda Mole. The borders of Alameda were made coextensive with the island in 1872, incorporating Woodstock into Alameda. In his autobiography, writer Mark Twain described Alameda as "The Garden of California."

The first post office opened in 1854. The first school, Schermerhorn School, was opened in 1855 (and eventually renamed as Lincoln School). The San Francisco and Alameda Railroad opened the Encinal station in 1864. Encinal's own post office opened in 1876, was renamed West End in 1877, and closed in 1891. On September 6, 1869, the Alameda Terminal made history; it was the site of the arrival of the first train via the First transcontinental railroad to reach the shores of San Francisco Bay, thus achieving the first coast to coast transcontinental railroad in North America.

The Croll Building, on the corner of Webster Street and Central Avenue, was the site of Croll's Gardens and Hotel, used as training quarters for some of the most popular fighters in boxing from 1883 to 1914. Jack Johnson and several other champions all stayed and trained here.]

The need for expanded shipping facilities and increased flow of current through the estuary led to the dredging of a tidal canal through the marshland between Oakland and Alameda. Construction started in 1874, but it was not completed until 1902, resulting in Alameda becoming an island.

Modern era

In 1917, a private entertainment park called Neptune Beach was built in the area now known as Crab Cove, which became a major recreation destination in the 1920s and 1930s. Both the American snow cone and the popsicle were first sold at Neptune Beach. The Kewpie doll became the original prize for winning games of chance at the beach – another Neptune Beach innovation. The park closed down in 1939.

The Alameda Works Shipyard was one of the largest and best-equipped shipyards in the country. Together with other industrial facilities, it became part of the defense industry buildup before and during World War II, which attracted many migrants from other parts of the United States for the high-paying jobs. In the 1950s, Alameda's industrial and shipbuilding industries thrived along the Alameda Estuary.

In the early 21st century, the Port of Oakland, across the estuary, has become one of the largest ports on the West Coast. Its operators use shipping technologies originally experimented within Alameda. As of March 21, 2006, Alameda is a "Coast Guard City", one of seven then designated in the country. As of 2018, it is one of twenty-one within the country.

In addition to the regular trains running to the Alameda Mole, Alameda was also served by local steam commuter lines of the Southern Pacific (initially, the Central Pacific). Alameda was the site of the Southern Pacific's West Alameda Shops, where all the electric trains were maintained and repaired. These were later adapted as the East Bay Electric Lines. The trains ran to both the Oakland Mole and the Alameda Mole.

In the 1930s Pan American Airways established a seaplane port along with the fill that led to the Alameda Mole, the original home base for the China Clipper flying boat. In 1929, the University of California established the San Francisco Airdrome located near the current Webster Street tube as a public airport. The Bay Airdrome had its gala christening party in 1930. The Airdrome was closed in 1941 when its air traffic interfered with the newly built Naval Air Station Alameda (NAS Alameda).

In the late 1950s, the Utah Construction Company began a landfill beyond the Old Sea Wall and created South Shore.

Eleven people, including pilot Lieutenant Robert Lee Ward, died in the crash and fire.

Geography

Alameda's nickname is "The Island City" (or simply "the island"). The current city occupies three islands as well as a small section of the mainland. Today, the city consists of the main original section, with the former Naval Air Station Alameda (NAS Alameda) at the west end of Alameda Island, Southshore along the southern side of Alameda Island, and Bay Farm Island, which is part of the mainland proper.

The area of the former NAS is now known as "Alameda Point." The Southshore area is separated from the main part of Alameda Island by a lagoon; the north shore of the lagoon is located approximately where the original south shore of the island was. Alameda Point and Southshore are built on bay fill.

Not all of Alameda Island is part of the City of Alameda; a small portion of a dump site west of the former runway at Alameda Naval Air Station extends far enough into San Francisco Bay that it is over the county line and therefore part of the City and County of San Francisco. 

Coast Guard Island, a small island between Alameda Island and Oakland, is also part of Alameda and is the home of Integrated Support Command Alameda.

Ballena Isle, an even smaller island, is also part of Alameda.

Climate
This region experiences warm (but not hot), dry summers, and cool (but not cold), wet winters. According to the Köppen climate classification system, Alameda has a warm-summer Mediterranean climate, abbreviated "Csb" on climate maps.

Hazards 
The low-lying island has seen sea-level and groundwater level rise threaten its infrastructure and people not just through flooding events, but through the increased liquefaction risk from more saturated soils. The locations of increasing groundwater-induced risks and flooding risks (such as from another megaflood) may be most precise in private insurance company maps.

Demographics

2010

The 2010 United States Census reported that Alameda had a population of 73,812. (2015 census estimates place the population at 78,630)

The racial makeup of Alameda was 37,460 (50.8%) White, 23,058 (31.2%) Asian, 4,759 (6.4%) African American, 426 (0.6%) Native American, 381 (0.5%) Pacific Islander, 2,463 (3.3%) from other races, and 5,265 (7.1%) from two or more races. Hispanic or Latino of any race were 8,092 persons (11.0%).

The Census reported that 72,316 people (98.0% of the population) lived in households, 857 (1.2%) lived in non-institutionalized group quarters, and 639 (0.9%) were institutionalized.

There were 30,123 households, out of which 9,144 (30.4%) had children under the age of 18 living in them, 13,440 (44.6%) were opposite-sex married couples living together, 3,623 (12.0%) had a female householder with no husband present, 1,228 (4.1%) had a male householder with no wife present. There were 1,681 (5.6%) unmarried opposite-sex partnerships, and 459 (1.5%) same-sex married couples or same-sex partnerships. 9,347 households (31.0%) were made up of individuals, and 2,874 (9.5%) had someone living alone who was 65 years of age or older. The average household size was 2.40. There were 18,291 families (60.7% of all households); the average family size was 3.06.

The age distribution of the population shows 15,304 people (20.7%) under the age of 18, 5,489 people (7.4%) aged 18 to 24, 21,000 people (28.5%) aged 25 to 44, 22,044 people (29.9%) aged 45 to 64, and 9,975 people (13.5%) who were 65 years of age or older. The median age was 40.7 years. For every 100 females, there were 91.7 males. For every 100 females age 18 and over, there were 88.5 males.

Per capita annual income (in 2013 dollars) in 2009–2013 was $41,340 per the US Census. Median household income in 2009–2013 was $74,606 per the US Census.

The homeowner vacancy rate was 1.1%; the rental vacancy rate was 5.7%. 37,042 people (50.2% of the population) lived in owner-occupied housing units and 35,274 people (47.8%) lived in rental housing units.

2000

As of the census of 2000, there were 72,259 people, 30,226 households, and 17,863 families residing in the city. The population density was 2,583.3/km (6,693.4/mi2). There were 31,644 housing units at an average density of 1,131.3/km (2,931.2/mi2). The racial makeup of the city was 56.95% White, 6.21% Black or African American, 0.67% Native American, 26.15% Asian, 0.60% Pacific Islander, 3.29% from other races, and 6.13% from two or more races. 9.31% of the population were Hispanic or Latino of any race.

There were 30,226 households, out of which 27.7% had children under the age of 18 living with them, 43.7% were married couples living together, 11.4% had a female householder with no husband present, and 40.9% were non-families. Of all households, 32.2% were made up of individuals, and 9.4% had someone living alone who was 65 years of age or older. The average household size was 2.35 and the average family size was 3.04.

In the city, the age distribution of the population shows 21.5% under the age of 18, 7.0% from 18 to 24, 33.6% from 25 to 44, 24.6% from 45 to 64, and 13.3% who were 65 years of age or older. The median age was 38 years. For every 100 females, there were 92.3 males. For every 100 females age 18 and over, there were 89.5 males.

The median income for a household in the city was $56,285, and the median income for a family was $68,625. Males had a median income of $49,174 versus $40,165 for females. The per capita income for the city was $30,982. About 6.0% of families and 8.2% of the population were below the poverty line, including 11.4% of those under age 18 and 6.1% of those age 65 or over.

There is a large Filipino community; and also a major Portuguese community, from which Tom Hanks' mother came and where Lyndsy Fonseca was raised for some time. Alameda also has a historic Japanese American community and had a small Japanese business district on a portion of Park Street before World War II, when the city's Japanese population was interned. A Japanese Buddhist church is one of the few remaining buildings left of Alameda's pre-war Japanese American community.

Economy 

Naval Air Station Alameda (NAS), decommissioned in 1997, was turned over to the City of Alameda for civilian development, today known as Alameda Point.

A cluster of artisan distilleries, wineries, breweries and tasting rooms along Monarch Street at Alameda Point is now referred to by the City of Alameda as "Spirits Alley". These and surrounding business include Almanac Beer Co., Building 43 Winery, Faction Brewing, and St. George Spirits. Admiral Maltings also sits in this area, supplying craft brewers and whisky producers, and is the first craft malting house in California.

The aircraft carrier , a museum ship, has been moored at the former Naval Air Station as the USS Hornet Museum since 1998.

Following the exit of the former Oakland Raiders, the Oakland Roots of the USL Championship have a license agreement for the former Raiders performance center with the City of Oakland and the County of Alameda.

Top employers
According to the city's 2020 Comprehensive Annual Financial Report, the top employers in the city are:

Arts and culture

The Alameda Arts Council (AAC) serves as the local Alameda City arts council. The Alameda Civic Ballet is the ballet troupe of the city. The Alameda Museum features displays on the history of Alameda. The Alameda Art Association has about 80 members as of January 2011, and has a gallery space at South Shore Center mall. The Association began in 1944. An annual benefit, Circus for Arts in the Schools, was started by clown artist Jeff Raz in 2004. Photo-realist Robert Bechtle has painted numerous Alameda subjects, including Alameda Gran Torino, which was acquired by SFMOMA in 1974 and remains one of Bechtle's most famous works.

Theaters

The city restored the historic Art Deco city landmark Alameda Theatre, expanding it to include a theater multiplex. The public opening was May 21, 2008.

The Altarena Playhouse, which performs comedies, dramas, and musicals, was founded in 1938 and is the longest continuously operating community theater in the San Francisco Bay Area.

Festivals
The Fourth of July parade is advertised as the second oldest and second-longest Fourth of July parade in the United States. It features homemade floats, classic cars, motorized living room furniture, fire-breathing dragons, and marching bands.

There are three major events when the street in Alameda's historic downtown district is closed to vehicular traffic. The Park Street Spring Festival takes place every May during the weekend of Mother's Day and attracts over 50,000 visitors. The Park Street Art & Wine Faire takes place the last weekend of every July and attracts over 100,000 visitors. The Park Street Classic Car Show is held on the second Saturday every October and displays over 400 vintage vehicles.

The annual Sand Castle and Sculpture Contest takes place in June at the Robert Crown Memorial State Beach. The first contest was held in 1967.

Government 

According to the California Secretary of State, as of February 10, 2019, Alameda has 48,609 registered voters. Of those, 27,323 (56.2%) are registered Democrats, 5,240 (10.8%) are registered Republicans, and 13,950 (28.7%) have declined to state a political party.

Alameda Free Library
After two previous failures, voters in the city passed a ballot measure in 2000 authorizing a bond measure for construction of a new main library to replace the city's Carnegie Library, damaged during the 1989 Loma Prieta earthquake. The city also received state funds for the new main library and opened the doors to the new facility in November 2006.

There are three library locations: the Main Library in downtown Alameda and two library branches; the Bay Farm Island Library serving the Bay Farm and Harbor Bay communities and the West End Library serving the West End of Alameda.

Education 

Public primary and secondary education in Alameda is the responsibility of the Alameda Unified School District, which is legally separate from the City of Alameda government (as is common throughout California). The College of Alameda, a two-year community college in the West End is part of the Peralta Community College District. The city has numerous private primary schools, and one private high school, St. Joseph Notre Dame High School, a Catholic school.

Media
Alameda's first newspaper, the Encinal, appeared in the early 1850s. Following the Encinal, several other papers appeared along geographic lines, and the Daily Argus eventually rose to prominence. Around 1900, the Daily Argus began to fade in importance and east and west papers The Times and The Star combined to take the leading role as the Alameda Times-Star in the 1930s. The Times-Star was sold to the Alameda Newspaper Group in the 1970s. In 1997, the Hills Newspaper chain was bought by Knight Ridder. In 2001, a new locally based newspaper, the Alameda Sun, was founded.

The Alameda community is currently served by two weekly newspapers, the Alameda Journal and the Alameda Sun, and a non-profit online news outlet called the Alameda Post.

Transportation 

Vehicle access to Alameda Island is via three bridges from Oakland (Park Street, Fruitvale Avenue, and High Street Bridges), as well as the two one-way Posey and Webster Street Tubes leading into Oakland's Chinatown. Connections from Alameda to Bay Farm Island are provided via the Bay Farm Island Bridge for vehicular traffic as well as the Bay Farm Island Bicycle Bridge (the only pedestrian/bicycle-only drawbridge in the United States).

California State Route 61 runs down city streets from the Posey and Webster Street Tubes, across the Bay Farm Island Bridge, and south to the Oakland Airport. The island is just minutes off Interstate 880 in Oakland. The speed limit for the city is 25 mph (40 km/h) on almost every road.

Public transportation options include:
 AC Transit buses, which range from local connections to Oakland and Berkeley to express service to San Francisco
 Ferry services – In addition to the Alameda/Oakland Ferry and the Alameda Harbor Bay Ferry routes, San Francisco Bay Ferry also provides service between Alameda Main Street Station and South San Francisco. All ferry services are operated by the Water Transit Authority.
 The closest BART stations are Lake Merritt and 12th Street, near the exit to the Posey Tube, and Fruitvale, near the Fruitvale Bridge. BART's long-term plans for a second tunnel include Alameda as a candidate for the first stop on a new East Bay line.

Notable people 
 Albert Arents, a mining engineer who helped develop mineral resources of the Rocky Mountains.
 John Baker, MLB catcher for San Diego Padres and Chicago Cubs, was born in Alameda.
 Hester A. Benedict (1838-1921), president, Pacific Coast Women's Press Association
 Shirley Temple Black, actress and former U.S. ambassador
 Mike Brisiel, an offensive guard for Oakland Raiders.
 Virginia Lee Burton, Caldecott-winning children's author and illustrator.
 Harold Camping, television and radio personality, president and general manager of Family Stations, Inc.
 Phyllis Diller, television comedian, attended Sunday school at First Presbyterian, married and lived in Alameda at the start of her comedy act in San Francisco in the 1950s.
 General James Doolittle, who received the Medal of Honor for his bombing of Japan during World War II; Doolittle was born in Alameda in 1896.
 Garrett Eckbo, landscape architect who lived in Alameda as a child, later forming the Bay Area firm of Eckbo, Royston, Williams with Robert Royston and Edward Williams.
 Leif Erickson, actor, born in Alameda in 1911.
 Larry Eustachy, college basketball coach, born in Alameda.
 Debbi Fields, founder of Mrs. Fields Cookies, attended Alameda High School, where she was a cheerleader.
 Albert Ghiorso, nuclear scientist, co-discoverer of 12 chemical elements on the periodic table; in Guinness Book of World Records for Most Elements Discovered.
 Brad Gillis, guitarist with Night Ranger, a San Francisco rock band formed in the 1980s.
 Katharine Graham, the late publisher of The Washington Post, lived in Alameda as a child, according to Personal History, her autobiography.
 Tim Hardaway Jr., a professional basketball player, was born in Alameda.
 Horace Heidt, bandleader and radio personality, born in Alameda on May 21, 1901.
 Emily Heller, comedian
 Marielle Heller, actress and director 
 Bruce Henderson, author, grew up in Alameda, according to his book Hero Found: The Greatest POW Escape of the Vietnam War.
 Benjamin Jealous, former President of the NAACP, lived in Alameda.
 Joseph R. Knowland, congressman and Alameda native, was editor and publisher of the Oakland Tribune.
 William Fife Knowland, U.S. Senator, was student body president at Alameda High School.
 Robert L. Lippert, theater chain owner and film producer, was an Alameda native.
 Paul Mantz, air racer and Hollywood stunt pilot, was born in Alameda in 1903.
 Louis A. McCall Sr., drummer and musician known as the co-founder of Con Funk Shun.
 Margaret McNamara, founder of Reading is Fundamental, and wife of Robert McNamara, grew up in Alameda.
 George P. Miller, a congressman from 1945 to 1973.
 Jack Mingo, author
 Hugo Wilhelm Arthur Nahl, designer of the Seal of California.
 Don Perata, former President Pro Tempore of California State Senate, lives in Alameda; once taught at Saint Joseph Notre Dame High, Encinal High, and Alameda High, among other Alameda schools.
 Carl Ravazza, bandleader, born in Alameda, 1910.
 Bill Rigney, Major League Baseball player and manager, was born in Alameda.
 Dutch Ruether, pitcher for 1927 New York Yankees, was born in Alameda.
Jane Sibbett, actress and comedian, grew up in Alameda.
 Operatic mezzo-soprano Frederica Von Stade has lived in Alameda since 1992.
 Sharon Tate, actress, resident in early to late-1960s.
 Charles Lee Tilden, for whom Tilden Regional Park is named, was a longtime resident of Alameda; Tilden Way at the southeast end of the city is named for him.
 Baseball Hall of Famer Willie Stargell, MLB player Tommy Harper, MLB player Curtell Howard Motton, 2003 National League Rookie of the Year Dontrelle Willis, 2007 National League Most Valuable Player Jimmy Rollins, NBA player J.R. Rider, and NFL players Melvin Carver and Junior Tautalatasi all attended Encinal High School.
 Jason Kidd (NBA player and coach) and Joe Nelson (MLB pitcher) attended St. Joseph Notre Dame High School in Alameda.
 MLB players Ray French, Johnny Vergez, Andy Carey, Bill Serena, Erik Schullstrom, Dick Bartell, Duffy Lewis and Chris Speier all attended Alameda High School.
 Many people from naval families, including celebrities such as Ann Curry, Brigette Lundy-Paine, Tom Hanks, and Jim Morrison of The Doors, have lived in Alameda.

Sister cities
Alameda's relationships with Wuxi and Jiangyin were initiated in 2005, in part, by Stewart Chen, who then served on the City of Alameda Social Service and Human Relations board, and who went on to be elected to Alameda City Council in November 2012.

Wuxi, China, is a so-called friendship city, because the diplomacy organization Sister Cities International does not recognize the relationship.

  Jiangyin, China
  Arita, Japan
  Yeongdong-gun, South Korea
  Lidingö, Sweden. Initiated in 1959 as part of President Eisenhower's people-to-people-movement, whose purpose was to develop better understanding among people from different countries after World War II. Both Alameda and Lidingö are islands with a bridge connecting them to a big city.
  Dumaguete, Philippines

Friendship city
  Wuxi, China (Friendship city since 2004)

See also 
 Alameda Island
 Bay Farm Island 
 Coast Guard Island
 List of islands of California
 List of ships built in Alameda, California

References

External links

 
 
 

 
1854 establishments in California
Cities in Alameda County, California
Incorporated cities and towns in California
Populated places established in 1854
Populated coastal places in California